The 2014 Pittsburgh Riverhounds season is the club's fifteenth  season of existence. It is the Riverhounds' fourth season playing in the USL Professional Division. It is the second season the Riverhounds played at Highmark Stadium, a 3,500 capacity soccer specific stadium.

Background 

After a modestly successful first season at Highmark Stadium, the Riverhounds, aided by investments of new majority owner Terry "Tuffy" Shallenberger, aimed to make headway on last season's 7th-place finish.

Pre-Season Activity

October 

On October 29, the Riverhounds held a press conference to announce the re-signings of two players:
Reigning USL-Pro MVP José Angulo was re-signed for 2014, with a club option in 2015
Midfielder Matthew Dallman was re-signed to a new two-year deal

November 

On November 5, the Riverhounds announced the signing of veteran Joseph Ngwenya from Richmond.
On November 7, an ad in the Pittsburgh Tribune-Review confirmed the signing of Ghanaian midfielder Anthony Obodai.
On November 26, the Riverhounds officially formed an affiliate partnership with Houston Dynamo of Major League Soccer, becoming the fifth USL club to have an MLS affiliate.  The partnership will be effective immediately, and  "will enable the Dynamo to loan a minimum of four MLS-contracted players to Pittsburgh for the 2014 USL PRO season."

February 

On February 7, the Pittsburgh Tribune-Review announced the re-signings of Mike Seth, Rob Vincent, Seth C'deBaca, Sterling Flunder, Mike Green, and Greg Blum.

March 
On March 20, the Riverhounds announced the signing of Collins John, a veteran of the Premier League, and MLS.
On March 26, the team filed for Chapter 11 Bankruptcy Reorganization.

Competitions

Preseason

USL Pro

Standings

U.S. Open Cup

Statistics

Squad information 
Statistics up to date as of 8/29*

Transfers

In

Out

Loan in

References

Pittsburgh Riverhounds
Pittsburgh Riverhounds SC seasons
Pittsburgh Riverhounds
Pittsburgh Riverhounds